Kenneth S. Hawkinson is an American academic administrator and communication scholar serving as the 12th president of Kutztown University of Pennsylvania. He assumed office on July 1, 2015.

Early life and education 
Hawkinson is a native of Carpentersville, Illinois. He earned a Bachelor of Arts degree in history and Master of Arts in speech communication from Western Illinois University, followed by a PhD in speech communication and performance from Southern Illinois University Carbondale. As a Fulbright scholar, Hawkinson taught abroad at the University of Ouagadougou. He also conducted research in African history and folklore.

Career 
Hawkinson served as a member of the Illinois National Guard and United States Army. As a field artillery officer and executive officer for a field artillery battery, he was called to active duty as an infantry officer in Germany. He was also a volunteer with the Peace Corps. In 2016, Hawkinson was inducted into the U.S. Army ROTC National Hall of Fame.

Hawkinson was an assistant professor, associate professor, and full professor of communication at Western Illinois University. He later worked as the provost and academic vice president, associate provost, and associate vice president for budget, planning and personnel. Hawkinson was selected as the 12th president of Kutztown University of Pennsylvania in 2015, succeeding F. Javier Cevallos.

References 

Living people
Year of birth missing (living people)
People from Carpentersville, Illinois
Western Illinois University alumni
Southern Illinois University Carbondale alumni
Academic staff of the University of Ouagadougou
Western Illinois University faculty
Kutztown University of Pennsylvania faculty
Peace Corps volunteers